In Old Caliente is a 1939 American Western film directed by Joseph Kane and starring Roy Rogers.

Plot
Set after California's Statehood but before the American Civil War, Roy Rogers is working for a wealthy Spanish family.  One of their men is secretly betraying the arrival of targets of opportunity to a group of Anglo American bandits but puts the blame on Roy.

The film has several unusual sequences such as having several scenes shot on a beach and having bandits after a giant sphere of gold. There is only one mention made of Caliente, California.

Cast 
Roy Rogers as Roy Rogers
Lynne Roberts as Jean Marshall
George "Gabby" Hayes as "Gabby" Whittaker
Jack La Rue as Sujarno
Katherine DeMille as Rita Vargas
Frank Puglia as Don José Vargas
Harry Woods as 'Curly' Calkins
Paul Marion as Carlos Vargas
Ethel Wales as Aunt Felicia
Merrill McCormick as Pedro

Soundtrack 
 Roy Rogers - "Sundown on the Rangeland" (Written by Fred Rose)
 Roy Rogers and George "Gabby" Hayes - "We're Not Coming Out Tonight" (Written by Walter G. Samuels)
 Roy Rogers - "The Moon, She Will Be Shining Tonight" (Written by Walter G. Samuels)
 Roy Rogers - "Ride On Vaquero"

External links 
 
 
 

1939 films
1939 Western (genre) films
Republic Pictures films
American black-and-white films
American Western (genre) films
Films directed by Joseph Kane
1930s English-language films
1930s American films